Ulf Leonhardt, FRSE (born 9 October 1965 in Bad Schlema, East Germany) is a German and British scientist. In 2006, he published the first scientific paper on invisibility cloaking with metamaterials at the same time Pendry's group published their paper in the journal Science. He has been involved with the science of cloaking objects since then.

He is a Wolfson Research Merit Award holder from the Royal Society, and he is currently Professor of Physics at the Weizmann Institute of Science. He is involved in research pertaining to metamaterials. Specific disciplines are quantum electrodynamics in media,  perfect imaging, optical analogues of the event horizon, reverse Casimir effect, metamaterial cloaking, quantum effects of optical phenomena involving Hawking radiation and light in moving media.

Career
In 1993, Leonhardt earned his PhD (theoretical physics) from the Humboldt University of Berlin.  From 1998 to 2000 he was in Stockholm at the Royal Institute of Technology as a Göran-Gustafsson Fellow. He held the chair (theoretical physics) at the University of St Andrews in Scotland between April, 2000 and 2012. Since 2012 he has been a Professor of Physics at the Weizmann Institute of Science.

Awards and honors
Professor Ulf Leonhardt is a Fellow of the Institute of Physics. He is also a Fellow of the Royal Society of Edinburgh. He is a recipient of the Otto Hahn Award of the Max Planck Society. In August 2009, the Royal Society's Theo Murphy Blue Skies award allowed Leonhardt to research a new theory for applying metamaterials to optical cloaking full-time.

Books authored
Ulf Leonhardt has authored, coauthored or edited the following books:
 277 pages.
Ulf Leonhardt and Thomas Philbin (2010). Geometry and Light. The Science of Invisibility. Dover Publications, Inc. . 278 pages.
 208 pages. PDF available here.

China Experiences
Ulf ventured into China in 2011 to collaborate with researchers and academics. 
In particular, he participated in "China 1000 Talent" program and the "Guangzhou Leading Overseas Talent" program. 
Such programs come with both individual cash bonus and research funding. Ulf was hosted by a research center 
at South China Normal University in Guangzhou, China and in 2012, he was awarded funding for both programs.
However, Ulf later realized there were possible foul play with the award money by his China counterparts. 
He later engaged a lawyer to investigate and Science magazine published an article entitled "Show me the Money?" in October 2014 to reveal more on the insights. Various news media began to cover 
on this topic  to warn foreign researchers and academics to be extra careful with foreign work contracts and in award 
funds handling and administration.

Around half a year later, in a later issue of Science magazine in 2015, Langping He, the Deputy Dean of the Centre for Optical and Electromagnetic Research (COER) and Academy of Advanced Optoelectronics, South China Normal University, published a response letter titled A Chinese physics institute's defense. In the response letter, the COER side addressed many allegations in the earlier article.

See also

Metamaterial scientists
 Andrea Alù
 Christophe Caloz
 Nader Engheta
 George V. Eleftheriades
 Ismo.V.Lindell
 John Pendry
 Vladimir Shalaev
 Ari H. Sihvola
 David R. Smith
 Costas Soukoulis
 Victor Veselago
 Richard W. Ziolkowski

Past artificial material scientists
 Jagadish Chandra Bose
 Horace Lamb
 Winston E. Kock
 Karl F. Lindman
 Leonid Mandelstam
 Walter Rotman
 Sergei Schelkunoff 
 Arthur Schuster

References

External links

 Original papers, books, book contributions, reviews and views, and conference proceedings.

1965 births
Living people
Engineering academics
Fellows of the Institute of Physics
Fellows of the Royal Society of Edinburgh
Metamaterials scientists
21st-century German physicists